Boels Rental is an equipment rental company based in Sittard, the Netherlands. Boels Rental has according to their website (January 2018) over 4000 employees and over 400 stores in the Netherlands, Belgium, Luxembourg, Germany, Austria, Switzerland, United Kingdom, Czech Republic, Poland, Italy, and Slovakia and around 2250 outlets.

In April 2017 Boels acquired the SupplyUK group having 25 locations in the United Kingdom.

Sponsoring
From 2012 to 2020, Boels was (together with Dolmans Landscaping) title sponsor of the Boels–Dolmans Cycling Team, an UCI women's road cycling team. Key riders for the team are world champion and 2016 Olympic champion Anna van der Breggen and former world champions Chantal Blaak and Amalie Dideriksen. Since 2013 Boels is also main sponsor of the Boels Ladies Tour and the Ardennes classics La Flèche Wallonne and Liège–Bastogne–Liège.

References

External links 
 Czech Republic 
 Netherlands
 Belgium
 Luxembourg
 Germany
 Austria
 Switzerland
 United Kingdom
 Poland
 Italy
 Slovakia

Companies based in Limburg (Netherlands)
Construction equipment rental companies